Rui Miguel Cabral Furtado (born 13 March 1989) known as Ruizinho, is a Portuguese footballer who plays for Oriental as a midfielder.

External links

1989 births
People from Ponta Delgada
Living people
Portuguese footballers
Association football midfielders
C.F. Os Belenenses players
Liga Portugal 2 players
C.D. Santa Clara players
Casa Pia A.C. players
CU Micaelense players
Clube Oriental de Lisboa players
Real S.C. players